Homalopoma, common name the dwarf turbans, is a genus of mostly very small sea snails with a calcareous operculum, marine gastropoda molluscs in the subfamily Colloniinae of the family Colloniidae.

Species
Species within the genus Homalopoma include:

 † Homalopoma acaste Thivaiou, Harzhauser & Koskeridou, 2019 
 Homalopoma africanum (Bartsch, 1915)
 Homalopoma agulhasense (Thiele, 1925)
 Homalopoma albidum (Dall, 1881)
 Homalopoma alfi Huang, Fu & Poppe, 2016
 Homalopoma amussitatum (Gould, 1861)
 Homalopoma baculum (Carpenter, 1864)        
 Homalopoma berryi J. H. McLean, 1964 
 Homalopoma bicolor Okutani, 2001
 Homalopoma boffii Marini, 1975
 Homalopoma carmelae Oliverio & Buzzurro, 1994
 Homalopoma clippertonense (Hertlein & Emerson, 1953)
 Homalopoma concors Huang, Fu & Poppe, 2016
 Homalopoma cordellensis J. H. McLean, 1996
 Homalopoma cunninghami (E. A. Smith, 1881)
 Homalopoma donghaiense (Dong, 1982)
 Homalopoma draperi J. H. McLean, 1984
 † Homalopoma emulum (G. Seguenza, 1876) 
 Homalopoma eoa Azuma, 1972
 † Homalopoma eugenii (Deshayes, 1863) 
 Homalopoma granuliferum Nomura & Hatai, 1940
 † Homalopoma granulosum (Grateloup, 1828) 
 Homalopoma grippii (Dall, 1911) 
 Homalopoma himuquitanense Huang, Fu & Poppe, 2016
 Homalopoma hui Huang, Fu & Poppe, 2016
 Homalopoma imberculi Huang, Fu & Poppe, 2016
 Homalopoma incarnatum (Pilsbry, 1903)
 Homalopoma indutum (Watson, 1879) 
 Homalopoma keyurare Huang, Fu & Poppe, 2016 
 Homalopoma lacunatum (Carpenter, 1864)
 Homalopoma laevigatum (G. B. Sowerby III, 1914)
 Homalopoma lini Huang, Fu & Poppe, 2016
 Homalopoma linnei (Dall, 1889)
 Homalopoma lunellum Huang, Fu & Poppe, 2016
 Homalopoma luridum (Dall, 1885) 
 Homalopoma mactanense Huang, Fu & Poppe, 2016
 Homalopoma maculatum Golikov & Gulbin, 1978
 Homalopoma maculosa (Pease, 1868)
 Homalopoma mikkelsenae Huang, Fu & Poppe, 2016
 Homalopoma mimicum LaFollette, 1976 
 Homalopoma nocturnum (Gould, 1861)
 Homalopoma nubisrubri Huang, Fu & Poppe, 2016
 Homalopoma parvum Huang, Fu & Poppe, 2016
 Homalopoma paucicostatum (Dall, 1871)   
 Homalopoma profundum Huang, Fu & Poppe, 2016
 Homalopoma quantillum Gould, 1861
 Homalopoma radiatum (Dall, 1918)
 † Homalopoma raulini (Cossmann & Peyrot, 1917) 
 Homalopoma rotundatum Sowerby, 1889
 Homalopoma rubidum (Dall, 1908)
 Homalopoma sangarense (Schrenck, 1862)
 Homalopoma sanguineum (Linnaeus, 1758)
 Homalopoma shisuiense (Makiyama, 1927)
 Homalopoma subobsoletum Willett, 1937
 Homalopoma tagaroae Huang, Fu & Poppe, 2016
 Homalopoma tapparonei (Caramagna, 1888)
 Homalopoma umbilicatum (Powell, 1926)
 Homalopoma unicum Huang, Fu & Poppe, 2016
 Homalopoma zephyrium Huang, Fu & Poppe, 2016

Species brought into synonymy 
 Homalopoma albobrunneum Bozzetti, 2014: synonym of Yaronia albobrunnea (Bozzetti, 2014) (original combination)
 Homalopoma arsinoense (Issel, 1869): synonym of Collonista arsinoensis (Issel, 1869) 
 Homalopoma carpenteri Pilsbry, 1888: synonym of Homalopoma luridum (Dall, 1885)
 Homalopoma concepcionensis H. N. Lowe, 1935: synonym of Haplocochlias concepcionensis (H. N. Lowe, 1933) (original combination)
 Homalopoma decolorum Tiba, 1983: synonym of Homalopoma eoa Azuma, 1972
 Homalopoma engbergi (Willett, 1929): synonym of  Homalopoma lacunatum (Carpenter, 1864)
 Homalopoma finkli Petuch, 1987 accepted as Cataegis finkli (Petuch, 1987)
 Homalopoma globuloides (Dautzenberg & Fischer, 1896): synonym of Cantrainea globuloides (Dautzenberg & H. Fischer, 1896)
 Homalopoma juanensis (Dall, 1919) : synonym of Homalopoma luridum (Dall, 1885)
 Homalopoma kussakini Egorov, 2000 : synonym of Lirularia iridescens (Schrenck, 1863)
 Homalopoma nocturnus [sic] : synonym of Homalopoma nocturnum (Gould, 1861) (incorrect gender ending)
 Homalopoma panamense (Dall, 1908): synonym of Cantrainea panamensis (Dall, 1908)
 Homalopoma pustulatum (Brocchi, 1821): synonym of Turbo pustulatus Brocchi, 1821
 Homalopoma rotundata [sic]: synonym of Homalopoma rotundatum (Sowerby, 1889)
 Homalopoma tosaense Habe, 1953: synonym of Cantrainea tosaensis (Habe, 1953) (original combination)

Other species include:
      
 Homalopoma crassicostata (Murdoch, 1905)
 Homalopoma fluctuata (Hutton, 1883)
 Homalopoma imperforata (Suter, 1908)    
 Homalopoma micans (Powell, 1931)
 Homalopoma nana (Finlay, 1930)
 Homalopoma peloritanum (Cantraine, 1835)        
 Homalopoma philipiana (Dall, 1889)        
 Homalopoma rotella (Powell, 1937)
 Homalopoma variecostata (Powell, 1937)

References

 Cooper J.G. (1867). Geographical catalogue of the Mollusca found west of the Rocky Mountains, between latitudes 33° and 49° north. San Francisco: Geological Survey of California. 40 pp.
 Oliverio M. & G. Buzzurro, 1994. A new Mediterranean species of the Genus Homalopoma, with notes on the Genusgroup (Trochoidea, Turbinidae, Colloniinae). Bollettino Malacologico, Milano, 30(5-9): 182-188.
 Gofas, S.; Le Renard, J.; Bouchet, P. (2001). Mollusca, in: Costello, M.J. et al. (Ed.) (2001). European register of marine species: a check-list of the marine species in Europe and a bibliography of guides to their identification. Collection Patrimoines Naturels, 50: pp. 180–213
 Williams S.T., Karube S. & Ozawa T. (2008) Molecular systematics of Vetigastropoda: Trochidae, Turbinidae and Trochoidea redefined. Zoologica Scripta 37: 483–506.
Taiwanese and Philippine Colloniidae. Nomenclatural remarks and the description of 17 new species (Gastropoda: Colloniidae). Visaya 4(5): 4-42

External links
New Zealand Mollusca database
 Carpenter P.P. (1864). Supplementary report on the present state of our knowledge with regard to the Mollusca of the west coast of North America. Reports of the British Association for the Advancement of Science. 33 (for 1863): 517-686
 Carpenter P.P. (1864). On new Californian marine shells. Part II. Proceedings of the California Academy of Sciences. 3(3): 175-177.
 Cossmann, M. (1888). Catalogue illustré des coquilles fossiles de l'Éocène des environs de Paris. Annales de la Société royale malacologique de Belgique. 23: [1-328; plates I-XII]
 Marshall, B. A. (1979). The Trochidae and Turbinidae of the Kermadec Ridge (Mollusca: Gastropoda). New Zealand Journal of Zoology. 6: 521-552
  Kaim, A.; Jenkins, R. G.; Hikida, Y. (2009). Gastropods from Late Cretaceous Omagari and Yasukawa hydrocarbon seep deposits in the Nakagawa area, Hokkaido, Japan. Acta Palaeontologica Polonica. 54(3): 463-490.

Colloniidae
Taxa named by Philip Pearsall Carpenter